Ying Ge is a Chinese-American biologist who is a Professor of Cell and Regenerative Biology at the University of Wisconsin–Madison. Her research considers the molecular mechanisms that underpin cardiac disease. She has previously served on the board of directors of the American Society for Mass Spectrometry. In 2020 Ge was named on the Analytical Scientist Power List.

Early life and education 
Ge was born in China. She attended Peking University for her undergraduate studies, where she studied chemistry. After graduating in 1997 Ge moved to the United States, where she joined Cornell University as a doctoral student. Here she started to work on mass spectrometry, using electron-capture dissociation to study proteins. She worked under the supervision of Tadhg Begley and Fred McLafferty. After completing her doctorate, Ge worked as a research scientist at Wyeth.

Research and career 
Ge joined the University of Wisconsin–Madison as an assistant scientist, where she oversaw the mass spectrometry programme. She became an Associate Professor in 2015, and full Professor in 2019.

Ge develops high-resolution mass spectrometry proteomics to better understand cardiac disease.  To image the very large proteins of human heart tissue, Ge combines fourier-transform ion cyclotron resonance (FT–ICR) mass spectrometry with electron-capture dissociation. She has worked to create a top-down disease proteomic platform that allows for the separation, detection and characterisation of the biomarkers of heart damage.

Nanoproteomics, a technique developed by Ge and co-workers, makes use of nanoparticles and high resolution mass spectrometry to capture and characterise cardiac troponins, including troponin I. Being able to test for and characterise troponin I would help with the early detection and diagnosis of heart disease. The peptide-functionalised superparamagnetic nanoparticles are combined with top-down mass spectrometry to identify the molecular fingerprints of troponins. Rather than just detecting cardiac troponins, which is possible using ELISA-based antibody testing, this higher level of characterisation will allow Ge to identify various forms of modified troponins, allowing a personalised understanding of cardiac disease.

Ge served on the board of the Top-Down Proteomics Consortium, on the editorial board of the Journal of Muscle Research and Cell Motility, as treasurer for the American Society for Mass Spectrometry (2016-2018).

Ying Ge publications indexed by Google Scholar.

Awards and honours 

 2016 Georges Guiochon Faculty Fellowship
 2018 H. I. Romnes Faculty Fellowship
 2019 Analytical Scientist Power List
 2020 American Society for Mass Spectrometry Biemann Medal
 2020 Analytical Scientist Power List
2021 Human Proteome Organization (HUPO) Clinical and Translational Proteomics Award
2021 Analytical Scientist Power List

Selected publications

References 

American people of Chinese descent
University of Wisconsin–Madison faculty
Peking University alumni
Cornell University alumni
Chinese chemists
Living people
Year of birth missing (living people)
Proteomics
Proteomics journals
Proteomics organizations
Mass spectrometry
Mass spectrometrists
Biochemistry
Cardiovascular physiology
Cardiovascular researchers